Andrés Iniesta (born 22 January 1974) is a Spanish wrestler. He competed in the men's freestyle 57 kg at the 1992 Summer Olympics.

References

External links
 

1974 births
Living people
Spanish male sport wrestlers
Olympic wrestlers of Spain
Wrestlers at the 1992 Summer Olympics
Sportspeople from Albacete